John Charles Beckley (26 February 1885 – 27 November 1964) was an Australian rules footballer who played with Essendon in the Victorian Football League (VFL).

Notes

External links 

1885 births
1964 deaths
Australian rules footballers from Melbourne
Essendon Football Club players
South Yarra Football Club players
People from North Melbourne